Kopačin Dol is a village in the municipality of Želino, North Macedonia.

Demographics
As of the 2021 census, Kopačin Dol had 818 residents with the following ethnic composition:
Albanians 753
Persons for whom data are taken from administrative sources 64
Others 1

According to the 2002 census, the village had a total of 907 inhabitants. Ethnic groups in the village include:

Albanians 898
Others 9

References

External links

Villages in Želino Municipality
Albanian communities in North Macedonia